The men's javelin throw event at the 2002 World Junior Championships in Athletics was held in Kingston, Jamaica, at National Stadium on 19 and 21 July.

Medalists

Results

Final
21 July

Qualifications
19 Jul

Group A

Group B

Participation
According to an unofficial count, 29 athletes from 25 countries participated in the event.

References

Javelin throw
Javelin throw at the World Athletics U20 Championships